This article lists wide variety or diversity of fish in the lakes and oceans of the state of Florida, United States.

See also
List of birds of Florida
List of mammals of Florida
List of reptiles of Florida
Fauna of Florida

References

'
'
Florida
'Florida
'
fish